Ridwan or Redwan (also Ridvan) was a place in the Ottoman Empire (in the Garzan area, south of Siirt in modern-day Turkey) that was inhabited by Yazidis.

Alternative name
The American missionary Henry A. Homes quoted the name "Yezidi Khan" as alternative name for Ridwan in the 19th century.

History
Ridwan was an autonomous Yazidi principality in the 19th century. First the Yazidi prince Mirza Agha ruled over the area and lastly Seid Beg. A castle and a river in the region were also known by the name Ridwan.

Population
The location was mainly inhabited by Yazidis, but a few hundred Armenians also lived there. Prince Mirza Agha built a church in Ridwan for the Christian Armenian inhabitants.

Massacre of the Yazidis in Ridwan
There were many armed conflicts between the Yazidis and the Muslim Kurds in Ridwan.  In particular, the Kurds of the Goyan tribe, who called themselves the "Knights of Islam", were especially hostile to the Yazidis. Once members of the Goyan tribe attacked a Yazidi caravan consisting of 1,500 unarmed horsemen and killed 500 of them. The Kurdish prince Bedir Khan Beg also carried out many massacres of the Yazidis. Some Yazidis migrated to Sheikhan and Sinjar to escape Kurdish harassment and persecution.

References 

Yazidi history
Ottoman Empire
Historical regions in Turkey
Kurdistan